Holywell Golf Club (Welsh: Clwb Golff Treffynnon) is a golf club, situated a mile southwest of the town of Holywell,  Flintshire, Wales. Instituted in 1906, it is an 18-hole moorland and parkland course and is approximately 800 feet above sea level. In 2001 the club nearly faced bankruptcy due to problems with Foot-and-mouth disease from roaming sheep.

Ancient site

References

External links
Official site

Golf clubs and courses in Wales
Golf club
1906 establishments in Wales